Ancilla djiboutina is a species of sea snail, a marine gastropod mollusk in the family Ancillariidae, the olives.

Description
Attains a size around 20 mm.

Distribution
This marine species is found off Djibouti, East Africa.

References

 Boyer F. (2015). Révision des Ancilla (Olividae: Ancillinae) de Masirah. Xenophora Taxonomy. 9: 3–14

External links
 Jousseaume [F.P. 1894. Diagnoses des coquilles de nouveaux mollusques. Bulletin de la Société Philomathique de Paris, 8(6): 98–105]

djiboutina
Gastropods described in 1894